John A. Coleman (born 9 August 1934) is a British conductor and music arranger.

Coleman started his work as a conductor in 1968 in Val Guest's film Assignment K. He was music supervisor for the 1968 films The Strange Affair and Negatives, and went on to become musical director for The Les Dawson Show (1979). Coleman has conducted the United Kingdom entries for the Eurovision Song Contest on five occasions: 1980, 1981, 1983, 1984 and 1985.

Filmography

References

External links
 

British male conductors (music)
Living people
Eurovision Song Contest conductors
1934 births
21st-century British conductors (music)
21st-century British male musicians